Waci (also spelled Ouatchi) is a Gbe language of Togo and Benin. It is part of a dialect continuum which also includes Ewe and Mina also known as Gɛn. It is scattered in an area Capo designates as Ewe speaking.

References

 Capo, Hounkpati B.C. (1988) Renaissance du Gbe (réflexions critiques et constructives sur L’EVE, le FON, le GEN, l AJA, le GUN, etc.) . Hamburg: Helmut Buske Verlag.

Gbe languages
Languages of Togo
Languages of Benin